Aleksey Katulevsky (born 19 December 1978) is a Kyrgyzstani former boxer. He competed in the men's light heavyweight event at the 2000 Summer Olympics.

References

External links
 

1978 births
Living people
Kyrgyzstani male boxers
Olympic boxers of Kyrgyzstan
Boxers at the 2000 Summer Olympics
Place of birth missing (living people)
Asian Games medalists in boxing
Boxers at the 2002 Asian Games
Asian Games silver medalists for Kyrgyzstan
Medalists at the 2002 Asian Games
Light-heavyweight boxers
21st-century Kyrgyzstani people